In Egyptian mythology, the Ogdoad ( "the Eightfold"; , a plural nisba of  "eight") were eight primordial deities worshiped in Hermopolis.

References to the Ogdoad date to the Old Kingdom of Egypt, and even at the time of composition of the Pyramid Texts toward the end of the Old Kingdom, they appear to have been antiquated and mostly forgotten by everyone except their theologians. They are frequently mentioned in the Coffin Texts of the Middle Kingdom. The oldest known pictorial representations of the group do not pre-date the time of Seti I (New Kingdom, thirteenth century BC), when the group appears to be rediscovered by the theologians of Hermopolis for the purposes of creating a more elaborate creation-account.

Texts of the Late Period describe them as having the heads of frogs (male) and serpents (female), and they are often depicted in this way in reliefs of the last dynasty, the Ptolemaic Kingdom.

Names
The eight deities were arranged in four male–female pairs. The names have the same meanings and differ only by their endings,

Attributes
The names of Nu and Naunet are written with the determiners for sky and water, and it seems clear that they represent the primordial waters.

Ḥeḥu and Ḥeḥut have no readily identifiable determiners; according to a suggestion due to Brugsch (1885), the names are associated with a term for an undefined or unlimited number, ḥeḥ, suggesting a concept similar to the Greek aion. From the context of a number of passages in which Ḥeḥu is mentioned, however, Brugsch also suggested that the names may be a personification of the atmosphere between heaven and earth (c.f. Shu).

The names of Kekui and Kekuit are written with a determiner combining the sky hieroglyph with a staff or scepter used for words related to darkness and obscurity, and kkw as a regular word means "darkness", suggesting that these gods represent primordial darkness, comparable to the Greek Erebus, but in some aspects they appear to represent day as well as night, or the change from night to day and from day to night.

The fourth pair has no consistent attributes as it appears with varying names; sometimes the name Qerḥ is replaced by Ni, Nenu, Nu, or Amun, and the name Qerḥet by Ennit, Nenuit, Nunu, Nit, or Amunet. The common meaning of qerḥ is "night", but the determinative (D41 for "to halt, stop, deny") also suggests the principle of inactivity or repose.

There is no obvious way to allot or attribute four functions to the four pairs of deities, and it seems clear that "the ancient Egyptians themselves had no very clear idea" regarding such functions. Nevertheless, there have been attempts to assign "four ontological concepts"
to the four pairs.

For example, in the context of the New Kingdom, Karenga (2004) uses "fluidity" (for "flood, waters"),   "darkness", "unboundedness", and "invisibility" (or "repose, inactivity").

See also
Ennead

References

Bibliography

External links

 

Groups of Egyptian deities
Creation myths

ca:Llista de personatges de la mitologia egípcia#O